Anqingosaurus brevicephalus (synonym Anguingosaurus brevicephalus) is an extinct lizard from the early Middle Paleocene of Anhui, China.
A. brevicephalus was originally described as a chameleon, but, not all authorities agree with this.  If A. brevicephalus is a chameleon, then Chamaeleonidae fossil record extends all the way into the Paleocene.  If it is not, then Chamaeleonidae fossil record starts in the Early Miocene with Chamaeleo caroliquarti.

References

Prehistoric lizard genera
†Anqingosaurus
Paleocene reptiles of Asia
Paleocene lepidosaurs
Fossil taxa described in 1976